Belgrave Walk tram stop is a stop on the Tramlink service near Mitcham in the London Borough of Merton. The stop is named after Belgrave Walk, an adjacent residential street to the north.

The tram stop consists of an island platform which is accessed by pedestrian level crossings at both ends of the platform. The crossing at the western end only serves the north side of the line, whilst the one at the eastern end forms a path connecting neighbourhoods on either side of the line. The Phipps Bridge tram stop is clearly visible to the west.

Connections
London Buses route 201 serves the tram stop.

References

Tramlink stops in the London Borough of Merton
Railway stations in Great Britain opened in 2000